The David A. Zegeer Coal-Railroad Museum is a local history museum located at 102 Main Street in Jenkins, Kentucky, across from the former Jenkins High School. The museum was dedicated on May 9, 1998.

The museum is housed in an authentically restored, 1911 train station which it shares with a bank. Included in the museum's collection are photographs of historic and modern coal mining, actual tools and other artifacts used by railroads and mines, and scrip formerly used in the company stores. All of the exhibits illustrate the history of Jenkins and the Consolidation Coal Company., and many of the exhibited items belong to local residents.

References

Museums in Letcher County, Kentucky
Mining museums in Kentucky
Railroad museums in Kentucky
Museums established in 1998
1998 establishments in Kentucky
Coal museums in the United States
Transportation in Letcher County, Kentucky
Jenkins, Kentucky